Maha Malik is a Pakistani novelist and screenwriter. She started her career through Khawateen digest and has written dozens of novels and plays for television. Most of her plays have been adapted for screen with the script written by herself for Geo TV, ARY Digital and Hum TV. She has been nominated for Best Television Writer at Lux Style Awards and Hum Awards. Her novels have been praised by Daily Times of Pakistan for her portrayal of women's lives.

Selected works

Novels 
 Aik He Lagan
 Dil Ka Muqadma Haar Kar
 Meray Khwaab Reza Reza
 Musafaton Kay Lamhay
 Tum Kon Piya
 Raigzaar e Tamanna
 Palak Pay Utartay Azaab Likhun
 Yeh Bulbulain Yeh Titliyaan
 Chaand Si Dulhan
 Jo Chalay Tou Jaan Say Guzar Gaye

Television plays
 Sandal
 Jo Chale To Jaan Se Guzar Gaye 
 Meray Khwab Raiza Raiza 
 Meri Ladli
 Maaye Ni
 Hal-e-Dil
 Na Kaho Tum Mere Nahi
 Ranjish Hi Sahi
 Kaash Aisa Ho
 Kaisay Tum Se Kahoon
 Mere Jeevan Saathi  
 Mere Meherbaan
 Tum Kon Piya
 Koi Chand Rakh
 Khasara
 Raaz-e-Ulfat
 Aye Musht-e-Khaak

Awards and nominations
 2014: Hum Award for Best Writer Drama Serial - Mere Meherbaan

References

External links
 Official website
 Maha Malik novels

Living people
Pakistani women writers
Pakistani novelists
Pakistani screenwriters
Pakistani dramatists and playwrights
Year of birth missing (living people)